Overlap may refer to:

 In set theory, an overlap of elements shared between sets is called an intersection, as in a Venn diagram.
 In music theory, overlap is a synonym for reinterpretation of a chord at the boundary of two musical phrases
 Overlap (railway signalling), the length of track beyond a stop signal that is proved to be clear of obstructions as a safety margin
 Overlap (road), a place where multiple road numbers overlap
 Overlap (term rewriting), in mathematics, computer science, and logic, a property of the reduction rules in term rewriting systems
 Overlap add, an efficient convolution method using FFT
 Overlap coefficient, a similarity measure between sets
 Orbital overlap, important concept in quantum mechanics describing a type of orbital interaction that affects bond strength

Overlapping can refer to:
 "Reaching over", term in Schenkerian theory, see Schenkerian analysis#Lines between voices, reaching over

See also
 Overlay (disambiguation)
 Overload (disambiguation)